Crawford is an unincorporated community in Overton County, Tennessee, United States. It is located just south of the intersection of Tennessee State Route 85 (Wilder Highway) and Tennessee State Route 164 (Hanging Limb Highway). Crawford has its own post office, with Zip code 38554.

Notes

Unincorporated communities in Overton County, Tennessee
Unincorporated communities in Tennessee